Radiococcaceae is a family of green algae in the order Sphaeropleales.

Genera
, AlgaeBase accepted the following genera:
Catenococcus F.Hindák
Chlororustica Shin Watanbe, N.Mezaki & Tatsuya Suzuki
Coenobotrys I.Kostikov, T.Darienko, A.Lukesová, & L.Hoffmann
Coenochloris Korshikov
Coenococcus Korshikov
Coenocystis Korshikov
Coenodispora I.Kostikov, T.Darienko, A.Lukesová, & L.Hoffmann
Crucigloea C.J.Soeder
Eutetramorus Walton
Follicularia V.V.Miller
Garhundacystis I.Kostikov & L.Hoffmann
Gloeocystis Nägeli
Herndonia Shin Watanabe
Hindakochloris A.Comas
Korshikoviobispora I.Kostikov, T.Darienko, A.Lukesová, & L.Hoffmann
Neocystis F.Hindák
Palmellosphaerium M.O.P.Iyengar
Palmococcus I.Kostikov, T.Darienko, A.Lukesová, & L.Hoffmann
Palmodictyon Kützing
Pharao A.A.Saber, Fucíková, H.McManus, Guella & Cantonati
Radiococcus Schmidle
Schizochloris Kostikov, Darienko, Lukesová & L.Hoffmann
Sphaerochloris Hindák
Sphaerococcomyxa I.Kostikov, T.Darienko, A.Lukesová, & L.Hoffmann
Sphaeroneocystis I.Kostikov, T.Darienko, A.Lukesová, & L.Hoffmann
Sporotetras Butcher
Thorakochloris Pascher
Tomaculum Whitford

References

Chlorophyceae families
Sphaeropleales